Edward Clifford Noonan (born Edward Clifford Davis on September 25, 1948 in Prescott, Arizona) was the chairman of the American Independent Party. He was replaced as party chairman by Markham Robinson in July 2008. At the same meeting, national affiliation of the party was changed to America's Independent Party, which was the new political party of Alan Keyes. Noonan attended Santa Barbara City College, served four years in the U.S. Army, then attended Sacramento City College, American River College and Sacramento State College. Noonan is married to Patricia Hansen, and they have a son, E. Justin Noonan who ran for California State Treasurer in 2006. He is a member of the Church of Jesus Christ of Latter-day Saints.

He was the winner of the 2002 AIP Primary for Secretary of State of California, receiving 85,791 votes (1.2%); was the winner of the 2006 AIP Primary for Governor of California in the California gubernatorial election, receiving 61,901 votes (0.7%). He filed to run for U.S. Congressman from California's 2nd congressional district in 2008, but did not get enough in-lieu signatures. He was the winner of the AIP Primary for US Senate in 2010 against Barbara Boxer. He received 125,435 votes (1.2%).

Noonan was sued by members of the AIP in 2008 attempting to remove him as State Party Chairman. Noonan won the case and retained Chairmanship of the AIP.

In 2012, Noonan won the AIP's California primary for President of the United States. However, the current leadership of the AIP (14 members) decided to not back the further candidacy of Noonan and instead went outside the party and nominated Tom Hoefling of the America's Party as the nominee for president.

Noonan left the party in 2012 and became founder and first National Committee Chairman of the American Resistance Party.

Noonan was a party in two unsuccessful lawsuits that challenged Barack Obama's eligibility to appear on California's ballots.

References

External links

1948 births
Politicians from Prescott, Arizona
Santa Barbara City College alumni
Sacramento City College alumni
American River College alumni
California State University, Sacramento alumni
Living people
American Independent Party politicians
Latter Day Saints from California
California Constitutionalists
Conservatism in the United States